James Bernard  Longley Jr. (born July 7, 1951) is an American politician from Maine. A Republican, he served one term in the United States House of Representatives representing Maine's 1st district from 1995 to 1997.

Longley was born in Lewiston, Maine, the son of former Independent Governor Jim Longley Sr. and his wife, Helen. Longley attended Phillips Andover Academy. He received his B.A. from Holy Cross, and then returned to study law at the University of Maine. He is also a veteran of the United States Marine Corps.

Before entering Congress, Longley served as a trial lawyer. He also managed several small businesses near Portland, Maine.

Longley was elected as part of the "Republican Revolution" of 1994, narrowly defeating Dennis L. Dutremble, the Democratic State Senate President from Biddeford, for the seat previously held by Thomas Andrews. Andrews had chosen to run for the United States Senate seat being vacated by Democrat George J. Mitchell.

Longley strongly supported national defense (including the work done in Maine at national defense installations and at Bath Iron Works where Navy destroyers are built) and he advocated in favor of stronger fiscal discipline within the federal government.

In one of his first actions in Congress, he offered testimony before a Congressional committee considering a minimum wage increase. In his testimony he presented the concept of cutting taxes paid by minimum wage workers to provide a greater increase in their take home pay. He pointed out that minimum wage increases cause small businesses to not only pay more in wages (hurting the businesses and forcing them in some cases to cut jobs and reduce their workforce to make up for wage increases) but that cutting the payroll taxes would actually increase the employees take home pay by a larger amount than raising the overall minimum wage. Longley noted in his testimony that minimum wage increases cause businesses, as well as employees, to pay more in federal taxes through employee percentage withholding and the business match of payroll taxes. He then accused the Democrats on the committee of only seeking a minimum wage increase to increase tax revenues for the federal government – a backdoor tax increase on American small business, he claimed. Democrats on the committee accused him of wanting to harm his constituents, led by a rant from Congressman Pete Stark, who was gaveled down by the Chairman for being out of order after Stark made reference to how they would use the issue against him in the next election. Longley's idea did not succeed.

He quickly became a prime target of the Democratic Party during the 1996 elections, and lost by almost 10 points to then-Portland Mayor Tom Allen. In the race labor unions and left leaning groups spent millions of dollars in a coordinated effort to defeat him. It was the largest effort of its kind on behalf of a Democratic candidate (or in opposition to an incumbent Republican) within the nation during the 1996 election cycle. Of course, smaller, but similar, sums were spent by business and professional organizations, and right-leaning special interest groups, in a coordinated effort to defend the seat. Longley is the last Republican to represent Maine's 1st congressional district as of 2022.

In 1998, Longley campaigned for Governor and was defeated by popular incumbent Angus King, an independent. Longley came in second place and received 19% of the vote.

See also

References

External links
 Retrieved on 2009-02-13
 

|-

|-

1951 births
College of the Holy Cross alumni
Living people
Maine lawyers
Politicians from Lewiston, Maine
Republican Party members of the United States House of Representatives from Maine
United States Marines
University of Maine School of Law alumni